Eric Young may refer to:

Eric Young Sr. (born 1967), American baseball coach and former Major League Baseball second baseman and left fielder
Eric Young Jr. (born 1985), his son, American baseball coach and former baseball second baseman and outfielder
Eric Young (cyclist) (born 1989), American professional cyclist
Eric Young (footballer, born 1952), English football player for Darlington
Eric Young (footballer, born 1960), Welsh international football player
Eric Young (wrestler) (born 1979), ring name used by Jeremy Fritz
Eric Young (broadcaster), New Zealand journalist and television presenter
Eric Young (American football) (born 1983), offensive guard at the University of Tennessee
Eric Young (drummer) (born 1984), drummer for Swedish sleaze band Crashdïet
Eric Templeton Young (1892–1915), Scottish rugby player